Juuso Ikonen (born 3 January 1995) is a Finnish professional ice hockey player who is currently playing for HPK in the Liiga.

Playing career
Undrafted, Ikonen in the 2012 regular season with Espoo Blues he had four goals and five assists in 20 games. In the playoffs, he had four goals and two assists in 15 games. His goals included one overtime game-winner.

In the 2016–17 season, Ikonen joined Djurgårdens IF of the SHL and was unable to find his footing in posting just 4 points in 25 games before transferring to Brynäs IF on 8 February 2017. On 15 May 2017, Ikonen after an initial successful spell with Swedish club, Brynäs IF, agreed to sign a one-year extension through 2018.

In the following 2017–18 season, Ikonen contributed with 12 goals and 26 points in 49 games to help Brynäs qualify for the playoffs. He added a further 3 goals and 5 points in 8 games during the post season.

On 2 May 2018, Ikonen, as a free agent, agreed to terms on a two-year, two-way contract with the Washington Capitals of the NHL. After attending the Capitals training camp, Ikonen was assigned to AHL affiliate, the Hershey Bears for the duration of the 2018–19 season. Ikonen struggled to produce offense with the Bears, totalling just 4 goals and 14 points in 54 games, failing to earn a recall to the NHL.

On 17 May 2019, Ikonen was placed on unconditional waivers by the Capitals and upon clearing was released from the remaining year of his contract to become a free agent. Ikonen opted to return and continue his professional career in Sweden, agreeing to a two-year contract with HV71 on 15 July 2019.

International play
Ikonen was a regular participant in national junior teams. He was selected to the 2012 and 2013 IIHF World U18 Championships and the 2015 World Junior Ice Hockey Championship.

Personal
His father Juha Ikonen is former Blues captain and their all-time leading scorer.

Career statistics

Regular season and playoffs

International

References

External links

1995 births
Living people
Sportspeople from Espoo
Brynäs IF players
Djurgårdens IF Hockey players
Espoo Blues players
Finnish ice hockey forwards
Hershey Bears players
HPK players
HV71 players
JYP Jyväskylä players
Oulun Kärpät players